Judit Magdalena Guerrero López (born 4 April 1961) is a Mexican politician affiliated with the PVEM. She currently serves as Deputy of the LXII Legislature of the Mexican Congress representing Zacatecas. She also served as Senator during the LIX LEgislature

References

1961 births
Living people
Politicians from Zacatecas
Women members of the Senate of the Republic (Mexico)
Members of the Senate of the Republic (Mexico)
Members of the Chamber of Deputies (Mexico)
Ecologist Green Party of Mexico politicians
21st-century Mexican politicians
21st-century Mexican women politicians
Women members of the Chamber of Deputies (Mexico)